The United States national wheelchair rugby team represents the United States in international wheelchair rugby. The USA is the most successful team in international competition, winning medals in all four Paralympic tournaments it has entered, coming away with two golds.

2000 Paralympics (Sydney)

2004 Paralympics (Athens)

A 2005 Academy-award nominated documentary film called Murderball, centers on the rivalry between the Canadian and U.S. teams leading up to the 2004 Paralympic Games. It was directed by Henry Alex Rubin and Dana Adam Shapiro, and produced by Jeffrey Mandel and Shapiro.

2008 Paralympics (Beijing)

2012 Paralympics (London)

The USA has clinched a berth in the 2012 Paralympics in London by virtue of its World Championship in Vancouver, British Columbia.

Roster
(Roster for the 2011 IWRF Americas Championship)

Competitive record

Paralympic Games

<div style="text-align:left">

IWRF World Championship

Past Rosters
2008 Paralympic Games: finished 1st among 8 teams
Jason Regier, Scott Hogsett, Norm Lyduch, Andy Cohn, Will Groulx, Bryan Kirkland, Seth McBride, Nick Springer, Chance Sumner, Mark Zupan, Joel Wilmoth, (Coach: James Gumbert, Assistant Coaches: Ed Suhr)
2010 World Championship: finished 1st among 12 teams
Chuck Aoki, Andy Cohn, Chad Cohn, Will Groulx, Derrick Helton, Scott Hogsett, Joe Delagrave, Seth McBride, Jason Regier, Adam Scaturro, Nick Springer, Chance Sumner, (Coach: James Gumbert)

References

A Laypersons Guide to Wheelchair Rugby Classification, International Wheelchair Rugby Federation (IWRF)

External links
US National Team at USQRA

Wheelchair Rugby
National wheelchair rugby teams